City of Peace may refer to:

 Jerusalem, from a folk etymology
 Myrhorod, Ukraine, whose name literally means "city of peace"
 Round city of Baghdad, (Arabic: Madinat al-Salam) the original core of Baghdad, Iraq
 Hiroshima, Japan, proclaimed a City of Peace in 1949
 Ciudad de la Paz ("City of the Peace" in Spanish), future city in Equatorial Guinea
 Osnabrück, Germany, in recognition of the Peace of Westphalia negotiated there
Sharm El Sheikh, Egypt, sometimes known as the "city of peace" due to the many diplomatic conferences held there
Ypres, know as the city of peace after World War 1

See also
 Dar es Salaam, the largest city of Tanzania, whose name translated from Arabic means "Abode of Peace"
 La Paz (disambiguation), the name of several cities; the name means "peace" in Spanish